Brigadier Crew Hadlett Stoneley OBE (9 May 1911 – 27 August 2002) was an English athlete who competed for Great Britain in the 1932 Summer Olympics.

He was born in Leeds, educated at Blundell's School and in 1931 received his commission in the British Army. Stoneley retired in 1964 as a Brigadier and served as Colonel Commandant of the Royal Signals. He died in Dorset.

Stoneley competed for Great Britain in the 1932 Games held in Los Angeles as the leadoff runner in the 4 x 400 metre relay where he won the silver medal with his teammates Tommy Hampson, David Burghley and Godfrey Rampling. In the 400 metre contest he was eliminated in the semi-finals.

At the 1934 British Empire Games he was a member of the English relay team which won the gold medal in the 4 x 440 yards competition. In the 440 yards event he won the bronze medal.

Stoneley was awarded the OBE.

External links
 sports-reference.com

1911 births
2002 deaths
Sportspeople from Leeds
People educated at Blundell's School
English male sprinters
British male sprinters
Olympic athletes of Great Britain
Athletes (track and field) at the 1932 Summer Olympics
Olympic silver medallists for Great Britain
Athletes (track and field) at the 1934 British Empire Games
Commonwealth Games gold medallists for England
Commonwealth Games bronze medallists for England
Officers of the Order of the British Empire
Commonwealth Games medallists in athletics
Royal Corps of Signals officers
Medalists at the 1932 Summer Olympics
Olympic silver medalists in athletics (track and field)
20th-century British Army personnel
Medallists at the 1934 British Empire Games